A fimbria (plural fimbriae, adjective fimbriate) is a Latin word that literally means "fringe."  It is commonly used in science and medicine, with its meaning depending on the field of study or the context.

Fimbria may refer to:

 Fimbria (bacteriology), a proteinaceous appendage in many gram-negative bacteria that is thinner and shorter than a flagellum
 Fimbria (bivalve), a genus of clams
 Fimbria (female reproductive system), a fringe of tissue near the ovary leading to the fallopian tube 
 Fimbria (neuroanatomy), a prominent band of white matter along the medial edge of the hippocampus in the brain

Fimbriate:
Fimbriate, in botany, fringed e.g. petals
Fimbriation, in heraldry and vexillology, is the use of contrasting strips to separate similar colours.

Roman name
Gaius Flavius Fimbria (consul 104 BCE), consul of the Roman Republic with Gaius Marius
Gaius Flavius Fimbria (d. 84 BCE), son of the consul of 104 BCE

pl:Fimbrie
zh:菌毛